Aunt Sally is a 1933 British musical comedy film directed by Tim Whelan and starring Cicely Courtneidge, Sam Hardy and Phyllis Clare. The film was made by Gainsborough Pictures at their Islington Studios, and released in the U.S. as Along Came Sally.

Premise
An American impresario trying to set up his new show in London tries to fend off an enthusiastic English performer's attempts to get in his show. She eventually tricks him into giving her the lead part by disguising herself as a French star.

Cast

 Cicely Courtneidge as Sally Bird / Mademoiselle Zaza
 Sam Hardy as Michael 'King' Kelly
 Phyllis Clare as Queenie Mills
 Billy Milton as Billy
 Hartley Power as 'Gloves' Clark
 Ben Welden as Casino
 Enrico Naldi as Little Joe
 Ann Hope as Joan
 Ivor McLaren as Madison
 Rex Evans as Percy
 Tubby Cipin as Tubby
 Leslie Holmes as Night Club Singer
 Debroy Somers as Bandleader
 The Three Admirals as Night Club Act
 Carlyle Cousins as Night Club Act

Critical reception
The New York Times found Cicely Courtneidge "not nearly as hilarious as most of the characters in "Along Came Sally" seem to believe," the reviewer concluding that the film has "several fair songs, an equal number of laughs and some dance routines that unsuccessfully ape the grand Hollywood manner"; whereas more recently, the Radio Times noted "A vehicle for the irrepressible comedienne and musical comedy star Cicely Courtneidge," calling it, a "good-natured and thoroughly silly little British musical," and concluding, "this is a romp for addicts of 1930s English nostalgia who will enjoy the numbers performed by such forgotten acts of the time."

References

Bibliography
 Cook, Pam. Gainsborough Pictures. Cassell, 1997.

External links

1933 films
British musical comedy films
1933 musical comedy films
Films directed by Tim Whelan
Films set in London
Gainsborough Pictures films
Islington Studios films
British black-and-white films
1930s English-language films
1930s British films